Kahatagaha is a village in the Kurunegala District, North Western Province, Sri Lanka.

It is the site of the Kahatagaha Graphite Mine, which is one of the largest graphite mines in the country.

See also
List of towns in Central Province, Sri Lanka

External links

Populated places in Kurunegala District
Geography of Kurunegala District